Ahmed Messadia is an Algerian professional football player. He plays for CA Batna in the Algerian Ligue 2.

Honours

References

External links
Ahmed Messadia at Soccerway
Ahmed Messadia at Footballdatabase

1986 births
Algerian Ligue Professionnelle 1 players
Algerian footballers
Living people
CA Batna players
JS Kabylie players
CS Constantine players
MO Béjaïa players
People from Batna, Algeria
Association football forwards
21st-century Algerian people